Zahos Hadjifotiou (1923 – 30 September 2022) was a Greek journalist and writer.

Biography
Hadjifotiou was born in 1923 in Plaka, Athens. In the Second World War, he took part in military operations and was decorated. He was married to Tzeni Karezi.

Between 1956 and 1962, Hadjifotiou worked as a director in a publishing house in Paris.

As a writer, he wrote for Greek newspapers, Kathimerini and Tachydromos.

Books
 The Middle East Affairs

References

1923 births
2022 deaths
Greek journalists
Greek writers
Journalists from Athens